The Tupolev Tu-204 is a twin-engined medium-range narrow-body jet airliner capable of carrying 210 passengers, designed by Tupolev and produced by Aviastar-SP and Kazan Aircraft Production Association. First introduced in 1989, it was intended to be broadly equivalent to the Boeing 757, with slightly lower range and payload, and had competitive performance and fuel efficiency in its class. It was developed for Aeroflot as a replacement for the medium-range Tupolev Tu-154 trijet. The latest version, with significant upgrades and improvements, is the Tu-204SM, which made its maiden flight on 29 December 2010. In April 2022, United Aircraft Corporation (UAC) announced plans to assemble 70 Tu-214s by 2030.

Design and development

The Tu-204 was designed as a family of aircraft incorporating passenger, cargo, combi and quick-change variants. It is powered by either two Aviadvigatel PS-90 or Rolls-Royce RB211 engines. The Tu-204 is produced at two of the largest Russian aircraft manufacturing plants in Ulyanovsk (Tu-204 series) and Kazan (Tu-214).

The Tu-204 cabin is available in several layouts, including the baseline single-class layout seating for 210 passengers and a two- or three-class layout designed for 164–193 passengers. A cargo version of the Tu-204 is being successfully operated by several airlines in Europe and Egypt.

Seating configuration is 3–3 in economy and 2–2 in Business class. The passenger cabin can be divided into compartments according to class with removable bulkheads and curtains. Compartments are illuminated by reflected light. Overhead bins for passenger baggage and coats are of the closed type.

In 1994, the first certificate for Tu-204 aircraft (with PS-90A engines) was issued. Subsequently, issued certificates have extended estimated operational conditions. The Tu-204-120 variant, certified with Rolls-Royce RB211-535E4 engines, complies with noise regulations described in Chapter 3 of Supplement 16 to ICAO, hence meeting all current European and ICAO requirements. It is currently undergoing the certification process with JAA. The Tu-204-100 variant, certified with PS-90A engines, complies with noise regulations described in Chapter 4 of Supplement 16 to ICAO which means it is quieter. The aircraft was certified to Russian standards AP-25 (harmonized with FAR-25 and JAR-25).

Technology

The Tu-204 is part of the same generation of Russian aircraft as the Ilyushin Il-96. The Tu-204 features technologies such as fly-by-wire control systems, a glass cockpit, supercritical wings with winglets, and is available with Russian or foreign avionics. The wings and tails are relatively resistant to ice build-up, and as such anti-icing systems are not equipped. Among today's airliners the Tu-204 is the only one which does not require wing anti-icing systems. During the test flight safety has been confirmed without the anti-icing system on the bearing surfaces and the aircraft obtained Russian and European certificates.

Tu-204 Variants

Tu-204/204C
The Tu-204 is the basic passenger airline model, and the Tu-204C is the basic freight or cargo model. The most-used models are the -100C and the -120C.

Tu-204-100/200

Certified in January 1995, this initial version is powered by Soloviev (now Aviadvigatel) PS90 turbofans with 157 kN (35,300 lbf) of thrust, and uses Russian avionics in addition to its Russian engines. The Tu-204-200 is a heavier version with extra fuel for more range. Only one was built by Aviastar-SP in Ulyanovsk but has not yet been delivered (RA-64036). Now this version is only produced by KAPO in Kazan, marketed under the designation Tu-214. The Tu-204-100C and Tu-204-200C are cargo versions of the −100 and −200 respectively, fitted with a forward main deck freight door. Currently, the Tu-204-100/200 is offered with the option of an up-rated Aviadvigatel PS90A2 turbofan, which promises 40% more service between overhauls.

Tu-204-120/220/120C/220C
To broaden product appeal, the Tu-204-120/220 offers non-Russian avionics and engines. It is powered by two Rolls-Royce RB211-535 engines, each with thrust of 192 kN (43,100 lbf). Egypt's Cairo Aviation became the debut operator in November 1998 when it took delivery of a Tu-204-120 and its cargo version the Tu-204-120C. The Tu-204-220 and Tu-204-220C cargo version, are a higher gross weight variants of the basic Tu-204-120.

Tu-204-300

A shortened, longer-range and more efficient derivative of the Tu-204, the Tu-204-300 is also known as Tu-234. The former Russian airline Vladivostok Air was the debut customer. This airline's aircraft are in a two-class seating configuration, with a 142-passenger capacity. Average numbers of flight hours during each 24-hour period is 9.35 hours, for year 2009. It is also operated by Air Koryo which currently operates one Tu-204-100B and one Tu-204-300. The Тu-204s operate on the Pyongyang-Beijing, Bangkok, Vladivostok, Shenyang and Kuala Lumpur routes.

Tu-204-500
This is a version of the Tu-204-300 optimized for shorter routes, featuring smaller wings and an increased cruising speed (to Mach 0.84), which makes it a competitor to the Next Generation Boeing 737. It is ETOPS rated, and fitted with a Honeywell 331-200ER APU.

Tu-206

The Tu-206 is a company-funded concept aircraft that, if built, would be used as a testbed for alternative fuels, specifically  liquefied natural gas.

Tu-204SM

The Tu-204SM, alternatively Tu-204CM, a medium-range airliner, is an upgraded version of the Tu-204-100/300. While the Tu-204SM will retain key design and aerodynamic features of the Tu-204-100/100E/100V series, there are numerous upgrades, largely aimed at meeting the current and near-future Russian and international standards, including those of ICAO and Eurocontrol.

The new cockpit features allow the Tu-204SM to be flown by a two-pilot crew (as compared with the three-pilot arrangement of the original Tu-204 series). These features include a new computer (VSUPT-85-2040), a new flight management system (ASO-204/FMS), wide LCD displays (KSEIS-204E), head-up displays (HUD), and an automated board system maintenance and diagnostic system. The electronic flight bag concept will be implemented and all controls and displays will be in English.

The Tu-204SM will be powered by two PS-90A2 engines. The latter is significantly improved over the original PS-90A power plants. and features a unified twin-spool turbofan with a high bypass ratio. The PS-90A2 is expected a life cycle cost saving of 35% over the original engine with a simultaneous increase in reliability in the 50 to 100% range. The PS-90A2 is designed to meet the Russian AP-33 aviation standard, which is harmonized with the US FAR Part 33 and the European JAR33.

There will also be a new APU (TA-18 APU-200) and upgraded fuel management, hydraulic and fire safety systems.

The updated passenger cabin accommodates a maximum of 210 passengers or 174 in a typical two-class layout.
The upgrades include new larger storage bins, multicolored LED lighting, sound-absorbing structures and a modern in-flight entertainment system (IFE).

The price for one Tu-204SM is estimated at USD 40–47 million.

The first test flight of Tu-204SM was successfully carried out on 29 December 2010. First deliveries of Tu-204SM were originally planned for 2011. As of December 2019, no Tu-204SM aircraft have been delivered and the project likely will never see fruition.

Tu-204SM orders
Red Wings Airlines was the first airline to operate the Tu-204SM. Ilyushin Finance Co. (IFC) said it would complete negotiations with Red Wings for 44 Tu-204SM aircraft in February, to sign a firm order in March 2011. Red Wings already operates a fleet of Tu-204-100 and Tu-204-100V jetliners, to which it added one airframe in 2010.
Russia's largest aircraft lessor, Ilyushin Finance, has previously placed Tu-204-100 aircraft with Cubana, Air Koryo and Red Wings, and Tu-204-300s with Vladivostok Avia and Air Koryo. Faced with low production rates for the Tu-204 models, Tupolev asked component providers to lower their prices in order to cut the plane's overall price by 27–30%. These suppliers agreed, on condition that 44 more firm orders be secured for the Tu-204SM through 2016.

By January 2012 a firm order from Red Wings had not been signed, the stumbling blocks being requests for guarantees of the residual value of the airframes and after-sales support at a cost the same as an equivalent Airbus or Boeing model. It was subsequently announced that Red Wings had cut back its initial commitment from 44 to 15 Tu-204SMs due to delays to the flight-test programme and after the lessor Ilyushin Finance reportedly "lost interest".

A large order by Iran Air Tours is under threat because of sanctions against the Iranian economy, as the American company Pratt & Whitney has been involved in the development of the engine with the Perm Engine Company. Completing the sale by re-equipping the Tu-204SMs with the Tu-204's Russian-made PS-90A engines has been proposed.

At the Singapore Air Show in 2016 the Vice President of the Russian United Aircraft Corporation stated that every company that has ordered the Tu-204 has gone bankrupt so there currently no orders for the Tu-204SM, and Tupolev has frozen on development work on the aircraft and the UAC will withdraw it from their list of aircraft prices as soon as the Irkut MC-21 comes to the market.

Tu-214 Variants

Tu-214
The Tu-214 is also a variation of the Tu-204 first flown on 21 March 1996. It is technically a Tu-204-200, one of the differences being that it is built by a different factory. Planes designated Tu-204 are produced in Ulyanovsk by Aviastar-SP; Tu-214 in Kazan by the Kazan Aircraft Production Association (KAPO). Both factories are independent from the Tupolev design bureau and have some control over the design of the variant they produce.

The main difference is a full-size main door at the left side of the fuselage just before the wing. The Tu-204 has two main doors and 2 emergency doors; the Tu-214 has 3 doors and one emergency door.

The Tu-214 is essentially a higher gross weight variant of the Tu-204, being fitted with extra fuel tanks and structural adjustments to deal with the heavier gross weight. For this reason, the Russian government prefers to use it as the platform upon which all further modifications for the 'Special Mission' variants will be based. Some of the special mission variants are claimed to be capable of a non-stop 10,000-kilometre flight range.

As of July 2018, a total of 3 Tupolev Tu-214 aircraft were in airline service with Rossiya.

In March 2022, CEO of Rostec Sergey Chemezov declared a possibility to relaunch big production of Tu-214 due to International sanctions during the Russo-Ukrainian War. On 6 April 2022, Yuri Slusar announced the United Aircraft Corporation (UAC)  had already started production of 20 Tu-214s to replace Russia's fleet of Boeing and Airbus passenger aircraft.

On 16 August 2022, United Aircraft Corporation announced plans to increase Tupolev Tu-214 production to at least 10-12 aircraft per year, with the aim to produce 70 Tupolev Tu-214 by 2030. The first Tu-214 for commercial flights will appear in 2023.

Tu-214ON

The Tu-214ON is an observation version of the Tu-204-200, equipped for Treaty on Open Skies missions and built by Kazan Aircraft Production Association. Vega Radio Engineering Corporation was contracted for the development of airborne surveillance system, ground-based complex and other mission equipment for the aircraft. It is equipped with one A-84ON panoramic camera, one AK-111 topographic camera and two perspective AK-112 digital aerial cameras to capture high-resolution aerial photography. Two video cameras, a Raduga infrared thermographic camera and Ronsard Side looking airborne radar are also fitted.

The first Tu-214ON (RA-64519) was demonstrated at the MAKS-2011 international air show in Moscow. It performed its first test flight on 1 June 2011, which was followed by a series of 24 flights by December 2011. The Ministry of Defence of the Russian Federation conducted state tests to verify the air and ground equipment of the Tu-214ON aircraft in April 2013. The jet was delivered to the Russian Defence Ministry on 22 August 2013. The second airliner (RA-64525) made its first flight on 18 December 2013 and was delivered on 4 July 2014. The Tu-214ON is set to replace the Tupolev Tu-154 and Antonov An-30 aircraft in the role.

After Russia withdrew from the Treaty on Open Skies in 2021, the two Tu-214ON used for treaty observation missions have been used for military observation flights in Crimea.

Tu-214PU
Airborne command post version. Six operated for the Russian President.

Tu-214SR
Communications relay version. 5 operated by Special Flight Unit Rossiya for the Russian government.

Tu-214SUS
Communications relay version for the Russian President. Two delivered.

Tu-214R

Special-mission versions of the Tu-214 commercial transport aircraft, developed under the codename 'Project 141', to replace the Il-20 Coot ELINT platform. The aircraft are configured to carry the MRC-411 multi-intelligence payload, to include electronic intelligence (ELINT) sensors, side-looking Synthetic Aperture Radar (SAR) and other Signals Intelligence (SIGINT). In addition, the aircraft will carry multi-spectral electro-optical systems. The aircraft has conducted test flights over the Sea of Japan but the programme experienced problems in January 2013. (Jane's Defence Weekly 16 January 2013)

The Tu-214R made its public debut in August 2013 at Moscow Air Show MAKS and was heralded as a platform for conducting surveillance of the U.S., in accordance with the Treaty on Open Skies, to monitor compliance with the relevant treaties.

As of January 2015, two were conducting test flights with the Russian Air Force.

In February 2016, Russia was reported to have deployed one Tu-214R to its base in Latakia, Syria.

In July 2016, two flights have been reported to have been conducted near the Latvian, Estonian and Finnish borders, with the plane (registry reported as RA-64514) conducting close approaches a few dozen kilometers of the Finnish border on 5 and 7 July.

After Syria operation, the aircraft was declared combat-ready. One plane was reportedly used against Ukraine in 2022.

Tu-214PU-SBUS
Special-purpose aircraft-control point equipped with a special onboard communication unit SBUS-214 intended for the Ministry of Defence of Russia. The aircraft is built with Russian-made components only, meeting the requirements of the state customers and has a range of at least . The main purpose of the aircraft is to provide additional communication capabilities to the user. The Russian MoD placed an order for two aircraft in November 2015. The first aircraft was delivered in March 2018 while the second in June the same year.

Tu-214LMK
A flying laboratory based on a serial Tu-214 passenger plane (registration number RA-64507) equipped with a multifunctional flight complex LMK-214. The aircraft is intended for an in-flight testing of a new radar complex and other on-board aviation equipment for the modernized Tupolev Tu-160M2 and the future Tupolev PAK DA strategic bombers. It began flight testing on 29 December 2018.

Operators

As of July 2018, there are 14 aircraft in commercial service. Total users as of August 2019 include:

As is common with post-Soviet Russian aircraft, the Tupolev is a relatively rare aircraft, with only 86 examples being built as of December 2019. However, because of the 2022 sanctions, Russia aims to build at least 10 jets per year to replace its fleets.

Previous operators

Production by year

Sources: Planespotters.net, Russianplanes.net;

Specifications

Accidents and incidents 
 On 14 January 2002, Sibir Airlines Flight 852, a Tupolev Tu-204-100 (RA-64011), experienced a flameout of both engines, glided and overran the runway at Omsk Airport and sustained minor damage, but was repaired and returned to service.
On 22 March 2010, Aviastar-TU Flight 1906, the same aircraft involved in the Sibir Airlines Flight 852 incident, crash-landed short of the runway near Moscow Domodedovo Airport while attempting to land at night in fog and poor visibility. There were no fatalities, but four of the eight crew members were seriously injured. It was a repositioning flight with no passengers on board. In September 2010, the МАК released their final report into the accident. The cause of the accident was attributed to pilot error, with a number of factors contributing to the accident including inadequate crew training and lack of cockpit resource management, failure of autoflight systems and serious regulatory violations by Aviastar-TU. This accident was the first hull-loss of the Tu-204.
 On 29 December 2012 at 16:35 local time (12:35 GMT), Red Wings Airlines Flight 9268, a Tupolev Tu-204-100В (RA-64047, c/n 1450743164047, s/n 047, built 2008) crashed on landing after overrunning runway 19 at Moscow Vnukovo International Airport (VKO) following a non-revenue repositioning flight originating from Pardubice Airport, Czech Republic. The aircraft broke up and came to a stop on elevated highway M3 about  past the runway's end. There were eight crew members on board of whom five were killed and the other three seriously injured. Apart from those, one man driving his car on M3 highway was seriously injured when the detached Tu-204's nosewheel crashed into the side of the car; the driver behind him recorded the impact on camera. The fatal Vnukovo accident was the second runway overrun incident involving a Red Wings operated Tu-204-100B in nine days following a Moscow Vnukovo to Novosibirsk flight on 20 December 2012 that overran runway 25 at Tolmachevo Airport by  into an open field. Flight data recorder readouts indicate that brake failure as well as engine thrust reverser issues were major contributing causes in both overruns resulting in the issuance of additional airworthiness directives. This accident remains the sole fatal accident involving the Tu-204.
On 24 August 2016, Aviastar-TU Flight 9625, a Tu-204S (RA-64021), was written off after landing hard at Norilsk Airport when it bounced on landing; when the aircraft taxied to its parking position, severe damage was found on the rear spar of the wing.
On 22 August 2018, one of the Aviadvigatel PS-90 engines on Red Wings Flight 808, a Tu-204-100 (RA-64050), from Ufa to Sochi experienced an engine surge during takeoff from Ufa International Airport and subsequently caught fire. The crew did not receive any fire indications, the automatic fire suppression system did not work, and the manual fire suppression failed to fully extinguish the flames. Emergency services put out the fire after landing while the passengers were evacuated through the right hand (emergency) doors via slides. There were no injuries. A Rosaviatsia (Russia's Civil Aviation Authority) commission was set up to investigate the occurrence.
On 8 January 2022, Aviastar-TU Flight 6534, a Tu-204-100C (RA-64032) operating for Cainiao, burned out following a cargo fire during pushback at Hangzhou Xiaoshan International Airport. The aircraft was due to begin a cargo service from Hangzhou to Novosibirsk.

See also

 Aircraft industry of Russia

References

Sources

External link
 

Tu-0204
1980s Soviet airliners
Twinjets
Low-wing aircraft
Aircraft first flown in 1989
Soviet and Russian military reconnaissance aircraft